Vojtěch Zapletal (born 15 December 1998) is a Czech male canoeist who won two medals at senior level at the Wildwater Canoeing World Championships.

Medals at the World Championships
Senior

References

External links
 

1998 births
Living people
Czech male canoeists
Place of birth missing (living people)